Theodore Evans Drury (born September 13, 1971) is a former American professional ice hockey player who played 414 games in the National Hockey League (NHL) for the Calgary Flames, Hartford Whalers, Ottawa Senators, Mighty Ducks of Anaheim, New York Islanders and Columbus Blue Jackets. He is the older brother of former NHL player Chris Drury, who is currently the President and General manager of the New York Rangers. He was born in Boston, Massachusetts, but grew up in Trumbull, Connecticut.

Playing career

NCAA
Drury played his college hockey at Harvard University, and was drafted 42nd overall by the Calgary Flames in the 1989 NHL Entry Draft. Drury was named Ivy League Rookie of the Year and earned ECAC All-Rookie accolades his freshman year (1989–90) at Harvard. Serving as team captain in 1992–93, Drury led the Crimson men's ice hockey team to the ECAC regular season title and a berth in the NCAA Men's Ice Hockey Championship. In 1992–93, he was named the most valuable player of the Beanpot tournament after scoring the game-winning goal and leading the Crimson to the Beanpot title. That same year, he was selected as a first team All-Ivy, first team All-ECAC and first team All-American. In 1992–93, he was also selected Ivy League Player of the Year, ECAC Player of the Year and was a finalist for the Hobey Baker Award. He was later named to the ECAC All-Decade Team for the 1990s.

Professional
In his NHL career, Drury played for the Calgary Flames, Hartford Whalers, Ottawa Senators, Mighty Ducks of Anaheim, New York Islanders and Columbus Blue Jackets.

From 2002 to 2007, Drury played in the Deutsche Eishockey Liga (DEL) for the Hamburg Freezers, Kassel Huskies and the Krefeld Pinguine.

Drury retired from professional hockey in April 2007. He was inducted into the Fairfield County Sports Hall of Fame in 2015.

International career
Drury represented the United States at the 1992 and 1994 Winter Olympics. Drury also competed for Team USA on numerous other occasions, playing in the 1990 and 1991 World Junior Championships. Drury also competed for Team USA at the 2003 IIHF Men's Worlds.

Personal life
Drury is married to former All-American lacrosse player Liz Berkery Drury. They have five children and reside in Winnetka, Illinois. His son, Jack, was drafted 42nd overall by the Carolina Hurricanes in the 2018 NHL Entry Draft.

Career statistics

Regular season and playoffs

International

Awards and honors

References

External links

1971 births
Living people
Albany River Rats players
American expatriate ice hockey players in Germany
American men's ice hockey centers
Calgary Flames draft picks
Calgary Flames players
Chicago Wolves (IHL) players
Columbus Blue Jackets players
Hamburg Freezers players
Harvard Crimson men's ice hockey players
Hartford Whalers players
Ice hockey players from Connecticut
Ice hockey people from Boston
Ice hockey players at the 1992 Winter Olympics
Ice hockey players at the 1994 Winter Olympics
Kassel Huskies players
Krefeld Pinguine players
Mighty Ducks of Anaheim players
New York Islanders players
Olympic ice hockey players of the United States
Ottawa Senators players
People from Trumbull, Connecticut
Springfield Falcons players
AHCA Division I men's ice hockey All-Americans
American expatriate ice hockey players in Canada